Pincus or Pinkus is a surname of Jewish origin, derived from the given name Pinkus, which in turn originates with the Biblical Hebrew male personal name Pinechas or Phinehas. The name may refer to:

Albert Pinkus (1903–1984), American chess player
Anne Pincus (born 1961), Australian artist
Barry Manilow (born Barry Pincus in 1943), American singer
Ed Pincus (1938–2013), American filmmaker
Edward Pinkus (1981-present), American comic book collector
David Pincus (1926–2011), American art collector
Fred Pincus (born 1942), American sociologist
Gregory Goodwin Pincus (1903–1967), American biologist 
Harold Alan Pincus (born 1951), American psychiatrist
Irving Pincus (1914–1984), American writer 
Jeff Pinkus (born 1967), American musician
Lionel Pincus (1931–2009), American businessman 
Mark Pincus (born 1966), American businessman
Mathilde Pincus (1917–1988), American music supervisor
Robert Pincus-Witten (born 1935), American art critic and historian
Tom Pincus (Australian rugby player)
Joe Pincus (Australian rugby player)
Shimshon Dovid Pincus (1944–2001), Israeli rabbi
Steven Pincus (born 1962), American historian at Yale, specializing on early modern England
Walter Pincus (born 1932), American journalist
Zachary Pincus-Roth (born 1979), American writer

See also
Pincus (disambiguation)

References

Jewish surnames